African-American writer and poet Maya Angelou (1928–2014) was honored by universities, literary organizations, government agencies, and special interest groups. Her honors include a Pulitzer Prize nomination for her book of poetry Just Give Me a Cool Drink of Water 'fore I Diiie, a Tony Award nomination for her role in the 1973 play Look Away, and three Grammys from five nominations for her spoken-word albums. Beginning in 1982, Angelou held the first lifetime Reynolds Professorship of American Studies at Wake Forest University in Winston-Salem, North Carolina.

She served on two presidential committees – for Gerald Ford in 1975 and for Jimmy Carter in 1977. In 2000, she was awarded the National Medal of Arts by President Bill Clinton. In 2010, she was awarded the Presidential Medal of Freedom, the highest civilian honor in the U.S., by President Barack Obama.  More than thirty health care and medical facilities have been named after Angelou.  She was awarded more than 50 honorary degrees.

Awards
{| class="wikitable sortable"
|-
! scope="col" | Year

! scope="col" | Honor

! class="unsortable" scope="col" | Notes

! class="unsortable" scope="col" | Ref.
|-
|1970
|Chubb Fellowship
|Given by Yale University, provides the recipient with an opportunity to make a public address open to the Yale and New Haven communities, as well as a meal, reception, or seminar with groups of students and faculty
| style="text-align:center;"|
|-
|1971
|Coretta Scott King Award
|Given to African-American authors and illustrators of books for children and young people
| style="text-align:center;"|
|-
|1972
|Pulitzer Prize nomination
|For Angelou's first book of poetry, Just Give Me a Cool Drink of Water 'fore I Diiie
| style="text-align:center;"|
|-
|1973
|Tony Award nomination
|For her role in the Broadway play Look Away
| style="text-align:center;"|
|-
|1975–76
|Member, American Revolution Bicentennial Council
|Appointed by President Gerald Ford; The council developed and planned activities and events celebrating the 200th anniversary of the American Revolution.
| style="text-align:center;"|
|-
|1975
|Rockefeller Foundation Bellagio Center Resident
|Competitive residency program at the foundation's property in Bellagio, Italy, where scholars and artists from all over the world work on projects of their own choosing for a period of four weeks.
| style="text-align:center;"|
|-
|1976
|Ladies' Home Journal "Woman of the Year in Communication" Award 
|Yearly award given by the magazine
| style="text-align:center;"|
|-
|1977
|Member, Presidential Commission for International Women's Year
|Appointed by President Jimmy Carter, the commission was established to make recommendations to end barriers to women's equality in the U.S.
| style="text-align:center;"|
|-
|1981
|Reynold's Professor of American Studies, Wake Forest University
|Lifetime appointment
| style="text-align:center;"|
|-
|1983
|Ladies' Home Journal "Top 100 Most Influential Women"
|Yearly award given by the magazine
| style="text-align:center;"|
|-
|1983
|Matrix Award
|Given by the New York Association for Women in Communications to women who excel in the field of communication
| style="text-align:center;"|
|-
|1984
|Member, North Carolina Arts Council
|Committee that gives recommendations to the state's art counsel, especially its policies regarding the arts
| style="text-align:center;"|
|-
|1986
|Fulbright Program 40th Anniversary Distinguished Lecturer
|Recognition by the U.S. Department of State for African Americans who have contributed to "increase mutual understanding between the people of the United States and the people of other countries ..."
| style="text-align:center;"|
|-
|1987
|North Carolina Award in Literature
|Highest honor bestowed by North Carolina; recognizes residents for contributions in scholarship, research, the fine arts, and public leadership
| style="text-align:center;"|
|-
|1990
|Golden Plate Award, Academy of Achievement
|Given for accomplishments in the sciences, business, industry, arts, literature, sports, entertainment, and public service
| style="text-align:center;"|
|-
|1990
|Candace Award, National Coalition of 100 Black Women
|Given to African-American women for leadership and achievement
| style="text-align:center;"|
|-
|1991
|Langston Hughes Medal
|Awarded to African-American writers who explore their cultural heritage
| style="text-align:center;"|<ref>{{cite book |last1=Knight |first1=Gladys L |editor1-last=Smith, Jessie Carney.  |title=Encyclopedia of African American Popular Culture |date=2011 |publisher=Greenwood Publishers |location=Santa Barbara, California |isbn=978-0-313-35797-8 |page=55 |chapter=Angelou, Maya (1928– ), Poet, Writer}}</ref>
|-
|1992
|Horatio Alger Award
|Yearly award to those "who have overcome adversity and made significant contributions in their fields"
| style="text-align:center;"|
|-
|1992
|Distinguished Woman of North Carolina award
|Given by the North Carolina Council for Women to women who make major contributions in the arts, business, education, government, recreation, or volunteerism
| style="text-align:center;"|
|-
|1992
|Crystal Award
|Honors women who have helped expand the role of women in entertainment
| style="text-align:center;"|
|-
|1992
|St. Louis Walk of Fame
|Honors individuals from the St. Louis, Missouri area who made major national contributions to our cultural heritage.
| style="text-align:center;"|
|-
|1993
|Inaugural Poet
|Named for reading her poem "On the Pulse of Morning" at President Bill Clinton's inauguration
| style="text-align:center;"|
|-
|1993
|Arkansas Black Hall of Fame
|Part of the first group of those native to Arkansas honored as role models for young people
| style="text-align:center;"|
|-
|1993
|Grammy, "Best Spoken Word Album"
|First Grammy, for inaugural poem "On the Pulse of Morning"
| style="text-align:center;"|
|-
|1994
|Rollins College Walk of Fame
|Stone dedicated on campus walkway made up of rocks and bricks from the homes of over 600 historical figures
| style="text-align:center;"|
|-
|1994
|Spingarn Medal
|Given by the National Association for the Advancement of Colored People (NAACP) for outstanding achievement by an African American
| style="text-align:center;"|
|-
|1995
|Frank G. Wells American Teachers Award
|Recognizes those outside the teaching profession who teach
| style="text-align:center;"|
|-
|1995
|Grammy, "Best Spoken Word or Non-Musical Album"
|For Angelou's performance of her poem Phenomenal Woman| style="text-align:center;"|
|-
|1996
|American Ambassador
|Given by UNICEF to assist with their fundraising efforts
| style="text-align:center;"|
|-
|1997
|Homecoming Award
|Given every two years by the Oklahoma Center for Poets and Writers to authors from the U.S. South and Southwest
| style="text-align:center;"|
|-
|1998
|NAACP Image Award
|Outstanding Literary Work, Nonfiction for “Even the Stars Look Lonesome,”
| style="text-align:center;"|
|-
|1998
|Alston-Jones International Civil & Human Rights Award
|Bestowed by the International Civil Rights Center & Museum in Greensboro, North Carolina, honoring individuals who have contributed to the Civil Rights Movement
| style="text-align:center;"|
|-
|1998
|National Women's Hall of Fame
|Inducted for making contributions to society and for the freedom and progress of women
| style="text-align:center;"|
|-
|1999
|Christopher Award
|The Christophers' annual media award, given to Angelou for her directorial debut (Down in the Delta)
| style="text-align:center;"|
|-
|1999
|Shelia Award
|Given by the Tubman African American Museum annually to "extraordinary black women of achievement"
| style="text-align:center;"|
|-
|2000
|National Medal of Arts
|Awarded by President Bill Clinton; Selected by the U.S. National Endowment for the Arts and awarded by the President of the United States to Americans who have contributed to the arts and culture
| style="text-align:center;"|
|-
|2002
|Lifetime Achievement Award
|Given as part of the Ethnic Multicultural Media Awards (EMMAs) presented at the annual Hay Festival of Literature & Arts in Wales
| style="text-align:center;"|
|-
|2002
|Grammy, "Best Spoken Word Album"
|For the audio book of A Song Flung Up to Heaven, Angelou's sixth autobiography
| style="text-align:center;"|
|-
|2003
|Museum of Tolerance "Finding Our Families, Finding Ourselves" multimedia exhibit
|Featured with Billy Crystal, Joe Torre, and Carlos Santana
| style="text-align:center;"|

|-
|2004
|Charles Evans Hughes Award
|Presented by the National Conference for Community and Justice for civic and humanitarian contributions
| style="text-align:center;"|
|-
|2005
|NAACP Image Awards
|Outstanding Literary Work, Nonfiction for Hallelujah! The Welcome Table| style="text-align:center;"|
|-
|2005
|Heart's Day Honoree
|Presented during Howard University English Department's annual celebration and conference
| style="text-align:center;"|
|-
|2006
|Mother Teresa Award
|Presented by the St. Bernadette Institute of Sacred Art in Albuquerque, New Mexico, after being nominated by the public at large
| style="text-align:center;"|
|-
|2007
|Martha Parker Legacy Award
|Given by the Cleo Parker Robinson Dance studio in Denver; attendees of the ceremony were served dishes from Angelou's cookbook Hallelujah! The Welcome Table| style="text-align:center;"|
|-
|2008
|Voice of Peace award
|First recipient of award presented by the Hope for Peace and Justice Center in Dallas; also in honor of Angelou's 80th birthday
| style="text-align:center;"|
|-
|2008
|Gracie Award
|Honors accomplishments in the media; for Angelou's radio show on XM Radio
| style="text-align:center;"|
|-
|2008
|Marian Anderson Award
|Honors "artists whose leadership benefits humanity"
| style="text-align:center;"|
|-
|2008
|Lincoln Medal
|Presented by Ford's Theatre to those who exemplify the legacy and character embodied by President Abraham Lincoln
| style="text-align:center;"|
|-
|2009
|Literary Award
|Given by the Black Caucus of the American Library Association, recognizing excellence in adult fiction and nonfiction written by African Americans
| style="text-align:center;"|
|-
|2009
|NAACP Image Awards
|Outstanding Literary Work, Nonfiction for Letter to My Daughter| style="text-align:center;"|
|-
|2010
|Presidential Medal of Freedom
|The highest American civilian honor; awarded by President Barack Obama
| style="text-align:center;"|
|-
|2012
|Black Cultural Society Award
|Given by Elon University in North Carolina, for humanitarian contributions for the promotion of world cultures
| style="text-align:center;"|
|-
|2013
|Literarian Award
|Given by the National Book Foundation
| style="text-align:center;"|
|-
|2013
|Norman Mailer Prize (Lifetime Achievement)
|Given by the Norman Mailer Center and The Norman Mailer Writers Colony to celebrate writers and their works
| style="text-align:center;"|
|-
|2014
|Conference of Minority Transportation Officials Lifetime Achievement award
|Given to celebrate the contributions of women leaders who work in transportation, and to recognize Angelou for being the first Black female streetcar conductor in San Francisco.
|
|-
|2015
|Stamp issued by the U.S. Postal Service
|The stamp features a quote, "A bird doesn't sing because it has an answer, it sings because it has a song", which was often cited by Angleou during interviews, but was written by Joan Walsh Anglund in 1967. President Obama wrongly attributed the sentence to Angelou during the presentation of the 2013 National Medal of Arts and National Humanities Medal.
| style="text-align:center;"|
|-
|2017
|Residence hall named in Angelou's honor at Wake Forest University.
|The first building at Wake Forest named for an African-American and the second named for a female faculty member.
| style="text-align:center;"|
|-
|2018
|Google Doodle
|In honor of what would have been Angelou's 90th birthday (April 4)
| style="text-align:center;"|
|-
|2019
|Butler Banner project
|Angelou was included in the list of names of women writers on a banner placed above the names of male writers etched at the top of Butler Library at Columbia University.
| style="text-align:center;"|
|-
|2022
|American Women quarters
|Will be one of the first two prominent American women honored in the coin series
|
|}

Honorary degrees

 Smith College, 1975
 Mills College, 1975
 Lawrence University, 1976
 Wake Forest University, 1977
 Columbia College Chicago, 1979
 Wheaton College, 1981
 Boston College, 1983
 Rollins College, 1985
 Howard University, 1985
 Tufts University, 1985
 Mount Holyoke College, 1987
 University of Southern California, 1989
 Northeastern University, 1992
 University of North Carolina at Greensboro, 1993
 Lafayette College, 1999
 Hope College, 2001
 University of Illinois at Urbana-Champaign, 2003
 Eastern Connecticut State University, 2003
 Chapman University, 2007
 Shenandoah University, 2008
 University of Redlands, 2011

Citations

Works cited
 Gillespie, Marcia Ann, Rosa Johnson Butler, and Richard A. Long. (2008). Maya Angelou: A Glorious Celebration. New York: Random House. 
 Lupton, Mary Jane (1998).  Maya Angelou: A Critical Companion''. Westport, Connecticut: Greenwood Press.

External links
Official Website of Maya Angelou

Lists of awards received by writer
Maya Angelou
African American-related lists